Kannan Iyer is an Indian filmmaker and actor. He has written films like  Daud (1997) and Victory (2009); and has also directed a supernatural thriller, Ek Thi Daayan, starring Emraan Hashmi, Konkona Sen Sharma and Huma Qureshi. The film got positive reviews from the critics and was declared a box office hit. His next directorial is an adaptation of Srishti Chaudhary's 2020 novel Lallan Sweets. The adaptation will star Sara Ali Khan and will be produced by Karan Johar.

Filmography

References

External links

Indian male film actors
Indian male screenwriters
Living people
Hindi-language film directors
Year of birth missing (living people)